Tal para cual is a Mexican sitcom series and a spin-off of the series La hora pico. The series is produced by Reynaldo López for TelevisaUnivision. The series follows the lives of Nacaranda (Consuelo Duval) and Lorena de la Garza (Nacasia). The series premiered on Las Estrellas on 13 October 2022. On 20 December 2022, the series was renewed for a second season.

Cast

Main 
 Consuelo Duval as Nacaranda
 Lorena de la Garza as Nacasia
 Reynaldo Rossano as Nacolás
 Gustavo Munguía as Molusco / Paul Yéster
 Javier Carranza as Nacosteño
 Hugo Alcántara as El Indio Brayan
 Nicole Vale as Nacol
 David Salomón as Hétor
 Maribel Fernández as Nacorita

Guest stars 
 Gabriel Soto as Ricardo Fernando Lascuraín
 Lupita Sandoval as Panchita
 Ricardo Fastlicht as Judge
 Emmanuel Palomares as Dónovan
 Paul Stanley as El Patotas
 Claudio Herrera as Police officer
 Roberto Tello as Blanket salesman
 Alfredo Adame as himself
 José Eduardo Derbez as Tatu
 Carlos Trejo as himself
 José Luis Cordero as Albino
 David Villapaldo as the Prosecutor
 María Elena Saldaña as Vidente Fernández
 Carlos Bonavides as Diógenes Cacho
 Ferdinando Valencia as Félix Calvo
 Arturo García Tenorio as Don Justo
 Gabriel Varela
 Herson Andrade
 Agustín Arana as Paco Gertz
 Yurem
 Tamara Henaine
 Michelle Rodríguez as Toña
 Armando Hernández as Brayan Dannielle
 Jorge van Rankin as Paco
 Edwin Luna as himself
 Ulises de la Torre as Mr. Tafolla
 Juan Antonio Edwards as the Inspector
 Pepe Magaña as Mr. Carcamo
 Michel López
 Erika Buenfil as Mrs. Corcuera
 Edson Zúñiga
 Ariel Miramontes as Albertano Santacruz
 Eduardo España as Margara Francisca
 José Elías Moreno
 Cynthia Urías as herself
 Sergio DeFassio

Episodes

Production 
In March 2022, producer Reynaldo López confirmed in that he was developing a spin-off of sketch show La hora pico, that centered around the characters of Nacaranda and Nacasia from the sketch Las Nacas. Filming of the series began in May 2022. On 15 September 2022, it was announced that the series would premiere on 13 October 2022.

Ratings 
 
}}

References

External links 
 

2022 Mexican television series debuts
Las Estrellas original programming
Mexican television sitcoms
Television series by Televisa
Spanish-language television shows